The grounds of the Palais des Nations (seat of the United Nations Office at Geneva) contain many fine objects donated by  member states of the United Nations, private sponsors and artists. The Celestial Sphere (also known as the Armillary Sphere) in the Ariana Park of the Palais des Nations is the best-known of these. The huge - over four meter diameter - Celestial Sphere is the chef d'oeuvre of the American sculptor Paul Manship (1885–1966). It was donated in 1939 by the Woodrow Wilson Foundation to what was then the League of Nations building.   Known also as the Woodrow Wilson Memorial Sphere of the Palais des Nations it is today a symbol of Geneva International and of Geneva as the centre of dialogue and peace.

History
Contacted in late 1935 by the Board of the Woodrow Wilson Foundation, Manship was asked to provide an idea for a memorial to President of the United States Woodrow Wilson as the founding father of the League of Nations. At that time the Palais des Nations was still under construction.

The first idea for Manship's contribution to the new buildings was to have him design two doors to the Assembly Hall from the Halle des Pas Perdus. Both the artist and the donor, the Woodrow Wilson Foundation, rejected this idea because doors would not be suitable for a memorial.  Manship then proposed a large-scale version of the present celestial sphere, which he had developed after years of study.  It is based upon several earlier versions, including the Aero Memorial in Philadelphia, Pennsylvania. It differs from these in that the Sphere is supported upon the backs of four tortoises, taken from his models for the gates to the New York Bronx Zoo, which in turn rest upon a stepped socle bearing a cast representation of the Chinese "celestial sea" (Hai Shui Jiang Ya). The tortoises may therefore be thought to represent the Chinese tortoise of immortality (Ao) - an auspicious symbol from Tang times on. Other zodiac signs come from the world's major civilizations, both past and present.

Manship described this sphere in the following words:

In a letter written by Ham Armstrong to Arthus Sweetser dated 30 June 1935, we read that the building committee considered the Celestial Sphere, which they had seen in Paris, superb, not only in originality of conception, but in delicacy of execution and in spirituality of meaning. However, two obstacles were foreseen; first, that it would cost more than the budget available and, second, that it would be difficult to obtain the approval of committee in New York and Geneva on anything so novel and non-utilitarian. Nonetheless, Manship's proposal for a monumental celestial sphere was accepted and a commission for the project was awarded to him in April 1936.

Process
In spring of 1936, immediately after the approval by the committee, Manship began working on a large-scale model in wax. At his atelier, he gathered a team of sculptors and other artists to work on the various aspects of the design. The team included such famous names as Angelo Colombo, Giuseppe Massari, and Richard Pousette-Dart, the renowned painter, who collaborated with Herbert Kammerer on the lettering of the sphere.

The original plaster moulds, executed by Flitzer, were ready in 1938 and were sent to the Bruno Bearzi Atelier in Florence for casting. The elements of the sphere were cast from these plaster moulds by Bearzi using a cire-perdu process from a bronze/zinc high-tin alloy with added lead. The constellations were originally gilded and applied stars, chrome-silvered. The meridians and architectural elements of the composition have been variously nielloed.

The Celestial Sphere measures 410 cm. in diameter and weighs some 5,800 kg. The spherical frame is adorned with constellations and stars. The Sphere represents eighty-five constellations of the universe and shows four stars of the first four magnitudes. The constellations are gilded and the 840 stars are silvered. As his signature, it bears Manship's self-portrait with his tools, in profile, hidden among the constellations.

A place for the Celestial Sphere
One of the main difficulties was to find a location for the sphere. Even though Manship designed it for the Court of Honour in front of the Assembly Hall, the question was raised in 1937 whether this space should be left completely open for a full panorama. When neither the Woodrow Wilson Foundation nor the artist wanted to hear of a change in 1938, it was decided to put the sphere in the middle of the Park, not too close to the building and not too close to the trees. The sphere was placed in a small reservoir that would reflect the image of the sphere and the building in the water. The sphere was installed in its present location, in the Court d'Honneur of the Ariana park of the Palais des Nations by the Bearzi Atelier in August 1939. The official inauguration of what has become a United Nations symbol took place in September 1939.

The sphere is equipped with a motor. In the words of the artist it was designed "so that it would rotate slowly" around an axis turned to the Pole star, and it was intended to be illuminated at night.

Major problems

The rotation system and illumination do not work

Due to the outbreak of the Second World War the rotation motor of the Celestial Sphere was used for several months only.   In the files of the Woodrow Wilson Foundation, the following brief description was found: "A complex silence and solitude reigned; the great ceremony of dedication, with the 30th Assembly in session, had become impossible: only an occasional chance visitor and a few especially interested Americans watched the Italians putting the great sphere, representative of universal comity, into its place of high honour."  The rotation motor of the Celestial Sphere was not used during 1940–1945 and ceased to function in the early 1960s.

The state of the Celestial Sphere is critical
The sphere began to have significant problems as early as 1942. The alloy used by the Bearzi Atelier contracted so sharply during the winter that a considerable amount of water could and did enter the hollow constellations. The freezing of that water caused the metal to crack. Already several of the constellations had to be repaired in 1942–43 and at least one cover of a meridian had to be replaced after falling off. "Weep holes" were drilled in all the constellations at that time to allow the water to drain out. The socle, which bears the whole of the 5,800 kg weight, has cracked. Large areas of corrosion and uneven natural patina are seen. The 840 chrome-plated stars, once present in four sizes, have been widely lost. The sphere cage is at the limit of its weight bearing load. Metal fatigue, cracks and corrosion have increasingly added to its deterioration.

Symbol of Peace - Pax Universalis
Today the Celestial Sphere stands in the Court d’Honneur of the Palais des Nations, itself an important landmark of the City of Geneva.  It serves as a vivid reminder that despite all cultural and religious differences we are inhabitants of one and the same planet of the galaxy, the Earth. The time has come to think in terms of Pax Universalis rather than of other Paxes, and one of the contributors to a Pax Universalis is an action-oriented dialogue, based on common human values and the ideals of the United Nations.

Gallery

References
 Jean-Claude Pallas (2001). Histoire et architecture des Palais des Nations, 1924-2001: l'art déco au service des relations internationales, Nations Unies, pp. 48, 65, 100, 111, 354.
 Franklin Delano Roosevelt, Edgar Burkhardt Nixon, Donald B. Schewe (1979)Franklin D. Roosevelt and foreign affairs, second series, January 1937-August 1939.
 Ernest Willian Watson, Arthur Leighton Guptill (1951), American artist, Watson-Guptil Publications.
 Janis C. Conner, Joel Rosenkranz, David Finn (1989). Rediscoveries in American sculpture: studio works, 1893-1939.
 (2006).Encyclopedia Americana, Scholastic Library Publishing, p. 264.
 I.Dembinski (2009). International Geneva Yearbook 2008, Dominique Dembinski-Goumard, p. 341.
 Harry Rand (1989). Paul Manship Smithsonian Institution Press, p. 124-126.
 (1949). United Nations world, UN World Inc., p. 63.
 Albert Picot (1965). Le rayonnement international de Genève, Editions du Griffon.
 Laure De Gonneville (2009). Suisse 2009 Edition Petite Futé.
 (2006). Geneva - centre for new dialogue among civilizations, UN Special Magazine, No. 652 (www.unspecial.org)
 (2008). Pax Universalis Aeternaque, UN Special Magazine, No. 671 (www.unspecial.org)
 Christian David and Evelina Rioukhina (2010). The Celestial Sphere Woodrow Wilson Memorial, UN Special (magazine), No. 699
 Tom Armstrong (1976). 200 years of American sculpture, Whitney Museum of American Art
 (1985) Paul Manship: changing taste in America: 19 May to 18 August 1985, Minnesota Museum of Art, Landmark Center.
 (2000). Booklet “The Dutch 17th Century in Etchings” for the exhibition of Rembrandt at the United Nations by Museum Geelvinck Hinlopen Huis (with the project proposals by Maecenas World Patrimony Foundation ((www.maecenasworldpatrimony.org) “Contribute to the Cycle of Life – the restoration of the Armillary Sphere”, Geneva.
 Alastair Duncan (1986). American art deco, Abrams.
 Carol Hynning Smith (1987). Drawings by Paul Manship: the Minnesota Museum of Art collection, Minnesota Museum of Art.

External links

 Genève tourisme
 La Genève internationale
 Peace monuments in Switzerland
 UN Special magazine
 Maecenas World Patrimony Foundation

Monuments and memorials in Switzerland
League of Nations
Tourist attractions in Geneva
Buildings and structures in Geneva
Ancient Greek astronomy
Historical scientific instruments
Astronomical instruments
Sphere
Works by Paul Manship
Sculptures of turtles
Birds in art
Fish in art
Snakes in art
United Nations art collection